Phyllonorycter rebimbasi is a moth of the family Gracillariidae. It is known from southern France and the Iberian Peninsula.

The larvae feed on Quercus coccifera. They mine the leaves of their host plant. They create a large lower-surface tentiform mine. Pupation takes place in a frass-covered cocoon within the mine.

References

rebimbasi
Moths of Europe
Moths described in 1910